John Ephraim Anderson (7 June 1931 – 2003) was an English professional footballer who played as a full-back for Grimsby Town.

References

1931 births
2003 deaths
Footballers from Northumberland
English footballers
Association football fullbacks
Grimsby Town F.C. players
Crystal Palace F.C. players
English Football League players